Kishor M. Wasan is a Canadian pharmacologist, pharmacist and professor. He was the dean of the University of Saskatchewan's College of Pharmacy and Nutrition from 2014 to 2019 and associate dean of research and graduate studies at the Faculty of Pharmaceutical Sciences at the University of British Columbia (UBC) from 2011 to 2014. Previously at UBC, he was chair of pharmaceutics and national director of the Canadian Summer Student Research Program after first joining the faculty in 1995. Wasan's research focuses on lipid-based drug delivery and the interaction between lipoprotein and pharmaceuticals. He has published more than 550 peer-reviewed articles and abstracts. He is a founding member and co-director of UBC's Neglected Global Diseases Initiative.

Early life and family 
Kishor M. Wasan's parents were both academics. His mother was a physician and his father, Madanlal T. Wasan (1930–2005), was a professor at Queen's University in Ontario. He showed interest in science from a young age and would "hang out in their labs asking questions about why and how things happened".

Education and career 
Wasan graduated with a Bachelor of Science in pharmacy from University of Texas at Austin in 1985. He then served as a decentralized hospital pharmacist for several years before beginning work on his doctorate under the tutelage of Gabriel Lopez Berenstein. In 1993, Wasan earned his Ph.D. in cellular and molecular pharmacology at the University of Texas Graduate School of Biomedical Sciences at Houston. He then completed a one-year post-doctoral fellowship on lipoprotein biochemistry at the Cleveland Clinic.

Wasan joined the faculty of the University of British Columbia in Vancouver in 1995 and earned tenure as an associate professor in 2000. Wasan was also chair of pharmaceutics and, in 2001, created the Canadian Summer Student Research Program for undergraduate pharmacy students at UBC. He served as national director of the program which was funded by the Merck Company Foundation. He was associate editor of the Journal of Pharmacy and Pharmaceutical Sciences and served on the editorial board of several other journals.

In 2009, he was named the CIHR/iCo Therapeutics Research Chair in Drug Delivery for Neglected Global Diseases, a joint project by the Canadian Institutes of Health Research (CIHR) and iCo Therapeutics. He is a founding member of UBC's Neglected Global Diseases Initiative, a program he co-directs with Richard Lester.

In September 2011, Wasan succeeded Helen Burt as associate dean of research and graduate studies at UBC's Faculty of Pharmaceutical Sciences. He was appointed dean of the University of Saskatchewan's College of Pharmacy and Nutrition in 2014. He served in the position until June 2019, when he was succeeded by Jane Alcorn.

Awards, honours, and other memberships 
Wasan is a member of the Canadian Society for Pharmaceutical Sciences (CSPS) and served as treasurer of the society in 2001–2002. He was later an at-large member of the CSPS board of directors in 2006–2010 and 2012–2014. In 2011, he was recognized with the CSPS Leadership Award for "outstanding contributions to Pharmaceutical Sciences in Canada". Wasan has been a fellow of the Canadian Academy of Health Sciences since 2010.

Selected bibliography 
Wasan's research focuses on neglected diseases, lipid-based drug delivery and the interaction between lipoprotein and pharmaceuticals. He has published more than 550 peer-reviewed articles and abstracts. A selection of his written work is listed below:

Journal articles

Book chapters

Books edited

References

External links 

 
 

Canadian pharmacologists
Canadian pharmacists
Living people
University of Texas at Austin alumni
University of Texas Health Science Center at Houston alumni
Academic staff of the University of British Columbia
Academic staff of the University of Saskatchewan
Year of birth missing (living people)